Ensam inte stark is the second Swedish-language studio album by Swedish singer and songwriter Petra Marklund. It was released on 13 November 2015 by Razzia Records and is the follow-up to Platinum-certified album Inferno.

Background

In May 2015, before Marklund's second summer as the host of Swedish sing-along show Allsång på Skansen, the single "Det som händer i Göteborg (Stannar i Göteborg)" was released. Whilst the artwork of the single is similar to the album design, the song was not featured on Ensam inte stark.

Track listing

Charts

References

2015 albums
Petra Marklund albums